is a Japanese voice actress affiliated with 81 Produce.

Filmography
Shimarisu-kun in Bonobono (first film)
Chisa Tsukamoto in Comic Party (TV), Comic Party Revolution (TV & OAV)
Hiroshi in Hamtaro (TV) 
Kirei in Cool Devices (OAV)
Nami in Jungle de Ikou! (OAV)
Anna (young) in Master Keaton (TV) (ep.6)
Toshiko's Mother in Chibi Maruko-chan (TV) 
Mei-Fah in Vampire Princess Miyu (TV) (ep.16)

External links

1967 births
81 Produce voice actors
Japanese voice actresses
Living people
Voice actresses from Tokyo Metropolis